TripTank is an American adult animated sketch comedy television series which premiered April 2, 2014 on Comedy Central. The show is made up of various sketches, portrayed by multiple animation styles created by many different animators and writers. Although no direct correlation exists between the different stories, a continued theme of dark satire prevails throughout.

Voicing talent includes Carlos Alazraqui, Bill Oakley, Wayne Brady, Bob Odenkirk, Curtis Armstrong, Nat Faxon, Tom Kenny, Rachel Butera, Larry David, Yotam Perel, Rob Yulfo, Zach Galifianakis, Kumail Nanjiani, Brett Gelman, Kyle Kinane, John DiMaggio, Duncan Trussell, Joey Diaz, Niecy Nash, among others.

On July 18, 2016, the series was cancelled after two seasons.

Recurring sketches
Several sketch characters and scenarios recur within the series sometimes inter-spaced throughout the same episode or only once per episode.
These include:
TripTank Reception - A scenario starting Steve (Jonah Ray), the receptionist for the show's animated broadcasters, and the janitor Roy W. Winchester (Eric Magnussen) who sulks around the lobby. The scenes are normally of Steven receiving calls from random people who watched the show, either to praise the show or express distaste for the content. After listening, Steve puts the caller on hold while he "transfers them to that department." There are also segments where Roy talks Steve into doing things that he normally wouldn't by himself.
Versus - A show hosted by Death, in which two groups of unfairly matched combatants are pitted against each other in a fight to the death. Examples include a 3rd grade soccer team versus the Mongolian Horde.
Jeff & Some Aliens - A trio of aliens come to Earth and invade the personal space of Jeff (Brett Gelman), who they consider to be the most average man on earth. It is later revealed that their analysis on Jeff is part of  their mission to judge humanity to see if it is worthy of survival or extermination by the aliens' overlords. This sketch originated a separate spin-off series of half-hour episodes, which premiered on January 11, 2017.
Suicidal Attention Whore Chicken - A short about a chicken who gets people to do whatever he wants by making suicide threats. Chicken publicly threatens to commit suicide for many reasons that range from gaining publicity, to making himself happier, to just downright pissing people off.
Dick Genie - A show about a nerdy teenage boy named Billy (Yuri Lowenthal) who has a magical Dick Genie (Kumail Nanjiani) that he is able to summon by masturbating. Dick Genie grants all of Billy's wishes based upon his perverted sexual fantasies. However, when he does this, his wishes always backfire on him and it's not always easy for him to undo his wish.
Suck it Gary! - Three guys (Dana Snyder, Andy Sipes, Matt Mariska) go out of their way and do horrible things to pull "friendly" pranks on a guy named Gary (Paul Reiser). Despite Gary being nice to them, the three guys hate him to the point to blame him for their misfortunes and basically attempt to ruin his life so they can tell him to "Suck it."
4:20 (Felix Colgrave) - Normally short, even by the shows standards, it shows various people going through seemingly serious situations until they are asked what time it is. A three-eyed hippie answers with "4:20", to which the other characters respond "Nice!" and proceed to get high on marijuana.
Bethiffer - A short about an obese, selfish and bully teenage girl, Bethany (Nick Swardson), and her friend Jennifer, whom she bullies (Ashley Fink), who have misadventures in a shopping mall all caused by Bethiffer.
Flower Teen Kill Team Go! - An anime style short about a four-girl team of Japanese teenage hitmen - Sada (Tammy Nishimura), Nari (Miley Yamamoto), Michiko (Niki Yang) and Rin (not spoken) - sent to Tamaulipas to take over the local drug cartels under the guise of transfer students. They also deal with the usual struggles of high school including driver's education and dating.
Ricky the Rocketship - A short of an anthropomorphic rocket (Tom Kenny) whose attempts to help children with their problems ends up with him unintentionally killing people. His sketch forced Ricky to call TripTank about the sketch.
Jerk Chicken - A short of a chicken (Dana Snyder) provoking people with his annoying personality and insults.
Animal Hitman - A short of a man in a suit walking up in the rain, then shooting various animals. The short always ends with a cheesy one-liner from the hitman.
Gusto Rules

Episodes

Series overview

Season 1 (2014)

Season 2 (2015–16)

Reception
The first two episodes of TripTank were met with very mixed reviews, as the A.V. Club stated: "TripTank is a mixed bag by default. If the good stuff doesn't stick around long enough, the silver lining is that the stinkers and the duds don't last much longer".

General feeling among reviewers was of much the same mind, with some reviewers calling the show "rude and irreverent", while some noted that the better quality sketches were enough to overcome the failure of the negative sketches, and compared the show to Liquid Television.

References

External links
Official page

2010s American adult animated television series
2010s American animated comedy television series
2010s American sketch comedy television series
2010s American surreal comedy television series
2014 American television series debuts
2016 American television series endings
American adult animated comedy television series
American flash adult animated television series
American animated variety television series
English-language television shows
Comedy Central original programming
Comedy Central animated television series
Animated television series about animals
Television series by ShadowMachine